Bellarine Highway is a main arterial highway that runs east from Geelong in Victoria along the Bellarine Peninsula to Queenscliff. The highway also provides the main route to Barwon Heads and Ocean Grove, localities along the southern coast of the peninsula.

Route
Bellarine Highway begins at the intersection of Latrobe Terrace and McKillop Street on the western edge of central Geelong runs east as a four-lane, dual-carriageway road through Geelong, where it eventually intersects with and changes name to Ormond Road, running south-east until the intersection with Boundary Road on the eastern edge of central Geelong, where changes name to Bellarine Highway in its own right and progressively heads south-east through Leopold. It eventually meets Grubb Road in Wallington, where it narrows to a dual-lane, single-carriageway road past Point Lonsdale. The highway eventually ends at Wharf Street, Queenscliff, where it meets the Peninsula Searoad Transport passenger and motor vehicle ferry which operates across Port Phillip Bay to Sorrento on the Mornington Peninsula.

History
The passing of the Highways and Vehicles Act of 1924 through the Parliament of Victoria provided for the declaration of State Highways, roads two-thirds financed by the State government through the Country Roads Board (later VicRoads). The Bellarine Highway was declared a State Highway in the 1947/48 financial year, from Geelong to Queenscliff (for a total of 20 miles); before this declaration, the road was referred to as Geelong-Queenscliffe Road. It was named after the Bellarine peninsula.

The Bellarine Highway was signed as State Route 91 between Geelong and Queenscliff in 1986; with Victoria's conversion to the newer alphanumeric system in the late 1990s, this was replaced by route B110, which continues on the other side of the bay at Sorrento to run along Point Nepean Road until Mornington. The Geelong end of the highway originally ran along Ryrie Street in the Geelong city centre, but was relocated a number of blocks south to Mackillop Street to remove heavy trucks from the shopping district in October 1997. 

The passing of the Road Management Act 2004 granted the responsibility of overall management and development of Victoria's major arterial roads to VicRoads: in 2006, VicRoads re-declared the road as Bellarine Highway (Arterial #6730), beginning at Latrobe Terrace at Geelong and ending at the end of the Bellarine Peninsula in Queenscliff.

Major intersections

See also

 Highways in Australia
 Highways in Victoria

References

Transport in Geelong
Highways in Victoria (Australia)
Bellarine Peninsula
Borough of Queenscliffe
Transport in Barwon South West (region)